Jörg Wischmeier (16 August 1935 – 3 October 2012) was a German athlete. He competed in the men's triple jump at the 1960 Summer Olympics.

References

1935 births
2012 deaths
Athletes (track and field) at the 1960 Summer Olympics
German male triple jumpers
Olympic athletes of the United Team of Germany
Sportspeople from Dortmund